The Plesiochelyidae are an extinct family of turtles in the clade Thalassochelydia originally classified within the Cryptodira suborder, mostly belonging from the Jurassic period. An alternate study placed the clade Thalassochelydia in the Angolachelonia and outside the Testudines.

References

 
Late Jurassic turtles
Prehistoric reptile families